This article presents a list of the historical events and publications of Australian literature during 2003.

Events
Peter Carey and Joan London join the list of authors who have withdrawn from contention for the Tasmania Pacific Region Prize. In 2002 Richard Flanagan and Tim Winton also declined to have their books nominated for the prize in protest at the involvement of Forestry Tasmania as a sponsor of the Ten Days on the Island festival at which the award winner is to be announced.
Members of The Australian Society of Authors (ASA) voted in their Society's 40th anniversary poll to select Australia's favourite book. Tim Winton's Cloudstreet headed the poll followed by The Man Who Loved Children by Christina Stead and The Fortunes of Richard Mahony by Henry Handel Richardson.
Nevil Shute's 1950 novel, A Town Like Alice was included in a BBC-sponsored UK survey of 100 popular novels, but has failed to make a similar Australian list.

Major publications

Literary fiction

 Alan Atwood – Burke's Soldier
 Peter Carey – My Life as a Fake
 Brian Castro – Shanghai Dancing
 J. M. Coetzee – Elizabeth Costello
 Julian Davies – The Boy
 Nikki Gemmell – The Bride Stripped Bare
 Peter Goldsworthy – Three Dog Night
 Shirley Hazzard – The Great Fire
 Kathryn Heyman – The Accomplice
 Janette Turner Hospital – Due Preparations for the Plague
 M. J. Hyland – How the Light Gets In
 Annamarie Jagose – Slow Water
 Nada A. Jarrar – Somewhere, Home
 Tom Keneally – The Tyrant's Novel
 Kathy Lette – Dead Sexy
 Colleen McCullough – The Touch
 Elliot Perlman – Seven Types of Ambiguity
 D. B. C. Pierre – Vernon God Little
 Patricia Shaw – The Five Winds
 Sue Woolfe – The Secret Cure

Children's and Young Adult fiction
 Pamela Allen – Cuthbert's Babies
 Paul Collins – The Earthborn
 Kate Constable – The Waterless Sea
 Marianne Curley – The Dark
 Justin D'Ath – Shaedow Master 
 Garry Disher – Eva's Angel
 John Heffernan – GBH
 Melina Marchetta – Saving Francesca
 David Metzenthen – Boys of Blood and Bone
 Jaclyn Moriarty – Finding Cassie Crazy
 Garth Nix
 Abhorsen
 Mister Monday
 Janeen Webb – The Silken Road to Samarkand

Crime
 Kirsty Brooks – The Vodka Dialogue
 Ian Callinan – Appointment at Amalfi
 Jon Cleary – Degrees of Connection
 Peter Corris – Master's Mates 
 Michelle de Kretser – The Hamilton Case
 Garry Disher – Kittyhawk Down
 Kerry Greenwood – The Castlemaine Murders: A Phryne Fisher Mystery
 Wayne Grogan – Junkie Pilgrim
 Gabrielle Lord – Lethal Factor
 Barry Maitland – The Verge Practice
 Matthew Reilly – Scarecrow
 Gregory David Roberts – Shantaram 
 Michael Robotham – The Suspect
 Steve J. Spears – Murder at the Fortnight
 Peter Temple – White Dog
 Lee Tulloch – The Cutting: A Nullin Mystery
 Robin Wallace-Crabbe – The Forger

Romance
Ally Blake – The Wedding Wish
 Lucy Clark – Englishman at Dingo Creek
Barbara Hannay – A Wedding at Windaroo
Stephanie Laurens – A Gentleman's Honor
 Di Morrissey – Barra Creek
 Candice R. Proctor – Beyond Sunrise
Meredith Webber – Outback Encounter

Science Fiction and Fantasy
 Max Barry – Jennifer Government
 K. A. Bedford – Orbital Burn
 K. J. Bishop – The Etched City
 Russell Blackford – An Evil Hour
 Trudi Canavan – The High Lord
 Cecilia Dart-Thornton – The Battle of Evernight
 Sara Douglass – God's Concubine
 Jennifer Fallon 
 Eye of the Labyrinth
 Lord of the Shadows
 Lian Hearn – Grass for His Pillow
 Ian Irvine – Terminator Gene
 Victor Kelleher – Born of the Sea
 Glenda Larke – The Aware
 Fiona McIntosh – Myrren's Gift
 Anthony O'Neill – The Lamplighter
 Kate Orman – Blue Box
 Tony Shillitoe – Freedom
 Kim Wilkins – The Autumn Castle
 Sean Williams and Shane Dix – Heirs of Earth

Drama
 Mireille Juchau – White Gifts
 Hannie Rayson – Inheritance
 Henri Szeps – One Life, Two Journeys
 David Williamson – Birthrights

Poetry
 Judith Beveridge – Wolf Notes
 Laurie Duggan – Mangroves
 Stephen Edgar – Lost in the Foreground
 Clive James – The Book of My Enemy : Collected Verse, 1958–2003
 John Kinsella – Peripheral Light

Non-fiction
 Fiona Capp – That Oceanic Feeling
 Inga Clendinnen – Dancing with Strangers
 Patricia Crawford and Ian Crawford – Contested Country: A History of the Northcliffe Area
 David Hollinsworth – They Took the Children
 Stuart Macintyre and Anna Clark – The History Wars
 Peter Robb – A Death in Brazil

Biographies
 Graeme Blundell – King: The Life and Comedy of Graham Kennedy
 Lorraine Day – Gordon of Dingley Dell: The Life of Adam Lindsay Gordon (1833–1870): Poet and Horseman
 Edward Duyker – Citizen Labillardiere: A Naturalist's Life in Revolution and Exploration (1755–1834)
 Greg Growden – The Snowy Baker Story
 Barry Hill – Broken Song: T.G.H. Strehlow and Aboriginal Possession
 Tom Keneally – Abraham Lincoln
 Jonathan King – Gallipoli: Our Last Man Standing: The Extraordinary Life of Alec Campbell
 Garry Linnell – Playing God: The Rise and Fall of Gary Ablett
 Peter Singer – Pushing Time Away: My Grandfather and the Tragedy of Jewish Vienna
 Nicholas Thomas – Discoveries: The Voyages of Captain Cook
 Anne Whitehead – Bluestocking in Patagonia

Awards and honours

Note: these awards were presented in the year in question.

Lifetime achievement

Fiction

International

National

Children and Young Adult

National

Crime and Mystery

National

Science Fiction

Non-Fiction

Poetry

Drama

Deaths
 16 March – Susan McGowan, poet (born 1907)
 18 March – Julie Lewis, short story writer (born 1925)
 30 March – Nick Enright, playwright and screenwriter (born 1950)
 2 April – Joan Phipson, writer for children and young adults (born 1912)
 20 April – Bill Wannan, editor (born 1915)
 1 May – Stephen Estaban Kelen, dramatist (born 1912)
 28 June – Clem Christesen, poet and founding editor of Meanjin (born 1911)
 30 June – Oriel Gray, playwright and screenwriter (born 1920)
 23 November – Hesba Brinsmead, writer for children (born 1922)

See also
 2003 in Australia
 2003 in literature
 2003 in poetry
 List of years in literature
 List of years in Australian literature
 List of Australian literary awards

References

Note: all references relating to awards can, or should be, found on the relevant award's page.

Australian literature by year
Literature
21st-century Australian literature
2003 in literature